Lieutenant General R Gopal, UYSM, AVSM, SM is a serving General Officer in the Indian Army. He retired as the Quartermaster General of the Indian Army. Previously, he commanded III Corps.

Early life and education 
He is an alumnus of Higher Command Course at Defence Services Staff College, Wellington; and National Defence Course Course at National Defence College, Delhi.

Career 
He was commissioned into 8 Gorkha Rifles. He has extensive experience in Northeast India. He has held numerous commands including an infantry battalion on the Siachen Glacier; a Mountain Brigade and an Assam Rifles range in South Assam. He was also one of the founding members of the Defence Command and Staff College at Botswana.

During his career, he has been awarded the Uttam Yudh Seva Medal, Ati Vishisht Seva Medal and the Sena Medal for his service.

Honours and decorations

References 

Living people
Indian generals
Indian Army officers
Year of birth missing (living people)
National Defence College, India alumni
Recipients of the Uttam Yudh Seva Medal
Recipients of the Ati Vishisht Seva Medal
Recipients of the Sena Medal
Defence Services Staff College alumni